The Communauté de communes du Kochersberg is a French intercommunal structure gathering most of the communes of the natural region of Kochersberg, département of Bas-Rhin, région Grand Est. Its area is 133.9 km2, and its population was 26,130 in 2019.

History 
It has been created on 14 December 2001 ; its head is set in Truchtersheim. The communes of the former Communauté de communes Ackerland joined the Communauté de communes du Kochersberg in January 2013.

Composition
The communauté de communes consists of the following 23 communes:

Berstett
Dingsheim
Dossenheim-Kochersberg
Durningen
Fessenheim-le-Bas
Furdenheim
Gougenheim
Griesheim-sur-Souffel
Handschuheim
Hurtigheim
Ittenheim
Kienheim
Kuttolsheim
Neugartheim-Ittlenheim
Pfulgriesheim
Quatzenheim
Rohr
Schnersheim
Stutzheim-Offenheim
Truchtersheim
Willgottheim
Wintzenheim-Kochersberg
Wiwersheim

References

External links 
 Official site

Commune communities in France
Kochersberg